Migliore (meaning 'better' or 'best'; ,  is the name of a chain of department stores in South Korea that specializes in selling clothing and fashion accessories. The first store opened in the Dongdaemun shopping district in Seoul in 1998, and another in Myeongdong, one of the premier shopping districts in Korea, in 2000. There are also stores in other major Korean cities, including Busan, Daegu, Gwangju, and Suwon.  There is an overseas store in Taipei, Taiwan.

See also
List of upscale shopping districts

External links
Korea's Migliore aims to be the mall with the most
Company website (Korean)

Retail companies of South Korea